Timothy Thomas Fortune (October 3, 1856June 2, 1928) was an orator, civil rights leader, journalist, writer, editor and publisher. He was the highly influential editor of the nation's leading black newspaper The New York Age and was the leading economist in the black community. He was a long-time adviser to Booker T. Washington and was the editor of Washington's first autobiography, The Story of My Life and Work.  Fortune's philosophy of militant agitation on behalf of the rights of black people laid one of the foundations of the Civil Rights Movement.

Early life
Timothy Thomas Fortune was born into slavery in Marianna, Jackson County, Florida, to Emanuel and Sarah Jane Fortune, and started his education at Marianna's first school for African Americans after the Civil War. His family moved to Jacksonville, where he attended Edwin M. Stanton School (predecessor of Stanton College Preparatory School) He worked both as a page in the state senate and as apprentice printer at a Jacksonville newspaper during the time that his father, Emanuel, was a Reconstruction politician in Florida. At one time Fortune also worked at the Marianna Courier and later the Jacksonville Daily-Times Union. These experiences would be the start of a career in which his work was published in more than twenty books and articles and in more than three hundred editorials. In 1874 he was mail route agent and then he was promoted to customs inspector for the eastern district of Delaware but only held this position for a few months before resigning in order to attend Howard University.

Although he was mostly self-taught prior to his college enrollment in 1875, Fortune was admitted to study law. He changed his major to journalism after two semesters before leaving school altogether to begin work, in 1876, at the People's Advocate, a newspaper in Washington, D.C. On February 21, 1878, Fortune married Carrie C. Smiley (née Caroline Charlotte Smiley; 1860–1940) in Washington, D.C.

New York journalist

Fortune moved to New York City in 1879 and began a process whereby over the next two decades he would become known as editor and owner of a newspaper named first the Globe, then the Freeman, and finally the New York Age.

Upon arrival in New York, Fortune began working as a printer, and worked at The Weekly Witness. In 1880 he became journalist and editor of The Rumor, run by George Parker and William Walter Sampson. This journal soon changed its name to The New York Globe. The Globe closed in November 1884 after a dispute with co-editor William B. Derrick, and one week later, on November 22, Fortune published the first issue of his New York Freeman. In the late 1880s, he was considered the greatest black newspaper writer in America. That same year he published a book entitled Black and White: Land, Labor, and Politics in the South that, along with his 1885 pamphlet, The Negro in Politics, openly challenged Frederick Douglass's dictum that "the Republican Party is the ship, all else the open sea". In 1885, The Freeman took the new name of The New York Age and set out to become "The Afro-American Journal of News and Opinion". In 1890 Fortune was elected chairman of the executive committee of the National Afro-American Press Association at their meeting in Indianapolis.

In Chicago on January 25, 1890, Fortune co-founded the militant National Afro-American League to right wrongs against African Americans authorized by law and sanctioned or tolerated by public opinion. The league fell apart after four years. When it was revived in Rochester, New York, on September 15, 1898, it had the new name of the "National Afro-American Council", with Bishop Alexander Walters as its first President and Fortune as a prominent member. Walters was followed as president by Fortune, who held the position from 1902 to 1904, and was succeeded by William Henry Steward. Booker T. Washington played a dominant role on the council and it included a number of important leaders, including W. E. B. Du Bois, who went on to form the NAACP, and anti-lynching activist Ida B. Wells. The League and the council had a vital role in setting the stage for the Niagara Movement, NAACP, and other civil rights organizations to follow. Fortune was also the leading advocate of using "Afro-American" to identify his people. Since they are "African in origin and American in birth", it was his argument that it most accurately defined them.

With Fortune at the helm as co-owner with Emanuel Fortune, Jr., and Jerome B. Peterson, the New York Age became the most widely read of all Black newspapers. It stood at the forefront as a voice agitating against the evils of discrimination, lynching, mob violence, and disenfranchisement. Its popularity was due in part to Fortune's editorials, which condemned all forms of discrimination and demanded full justice for all African Americans. Ida B. Wells's newspaper Memphis Free Speech and Headlight had its printing press destroyed and building burned as the result of an article published in it on May 25, 1892. Fortune then gave her a job and a new platform from which to detail and condemn lynching. His book The Kind of Education the Afro-American Most Needs was published in 1898, and Dreams of Life: Miscellaneous Poems in 1905. After a nervous breakdown, Fortune sold the New York Age to Fred R. Moore in 1907, who continued publishing it until 1960. Fortune published another book, The New York Negro in Journalism, in 1915.

In the 1900 presidential election he campaigned for William McKinley, and he was politically active in the Republican Party. However, he was noted for criticizing corruption in both parties and advocating good principles for all.

Negro World
Fortune went to work as an editor at the Universal Negro Improvement Association and African Communities League's house organ, the Negro World, in 1923. Its circulation, at its height, was more than 200,000. With distribution throughout the United States, Canada, Europe, Africa, the Caribbean and Central America.

Fortune rubbed shoulders with such literary luminaries as Zora Neale Hurston, W. A. Domingo, Hubert Harrison, and John E. Bruce.

Later life
Fortune moved to Red Bank, New Jersey, in 1901, where he built his home, Maple Hall. The house was placed on the National Register of Historic Places on December 8, 1976, and the New Jersey Register of Historic Places on August 16, 1979.

Fortune died in 1928 at the age of 71 in Philadelphia, Pennsylvania and is interred at Eden Cemetery in Collingdale, Pennsylvania.

References

Sources
 Curry, Tommy J. "The Fortune of Wells: Ida B. Wells-Barnett’s Use of T. Thomas Fortune’s Philosophy of Social Agitation as a Prolegomenon to Militant Civil Rights Activism," Transactions of the Charles S. Peirce Society: A Quarterly Journal in American Philosophy (2012), 48#4, pp. 457–82 in Project MUSE
 Nelson,  Claudia D. "The Men that Influenced Ida B. Wells-Barnett: Jim Wells, T. Thomas Fortune, and Frederick Douglass," Making Connections: A Journal for Teachers of Cultural Diversity (2006), 10#1, pp. 25–44. 
  Thornbrough, Emma Lou.  T. Thomas Fortune: Militant Journalist (1972), the standard scholarly biography

Primary sources
 Alexander, Shawn, ed. T. Thomas Fortune, the Afro-American Agitator: A Collection of Writings, 1880-1928 (2010)

External links

Soldiers without Swords Biographies
Tuskegee's point-man, Timothy Fortune
Ida B. Wells-Barnett
The Reader's Companion to American History
T. Thomas Fortune House
Letter from T. Thomas Fortune to George Myers
After Reconstruction: Problems of African Americans in the South
An Army of Lions: The Civil Rights Struggle Before the NAACP
 
 
 

1856 births
1928 deaths
African-American writers
Howard University alumni
People from Red Bank, New Jersey
Universal Negro Improvement Association and African Communities League members
People from Marianna, Florida
New York (state) Republicans
New Jersey Republicans
Burials at Eden Cemetery (Collingdale, Pennsylvania)